Professor Alexander Evans OBE is a Professor in Practice at the London School of Economics and former Strategy Director at the Cabinet Office (until October 2022). He is a former adviser in 10 Downing Street (2020-2021). He was previously Director Cyber in the Foreign Office (2018-2020), Britain's Deputy High Commissioner to India (2015-2018), and acting British High Commissioner to India from November 2015 to March 2016. He is a former senior fellow at Yale University, Gwilym Gibbon Fellow at Nuffield College Oxford and Henry Kissinger Chair in Foreign Policy at the Library of Congress.

References

Year of birth missing (living people)
Living people
High Commissioners of the United Kingdom to India